Masaru Edward Fulenwider-Musashi (born April 26, 1977 in Rikuzentakata, Iwate, Japan), better known by the stage name , is a Wushu martial artist and a stuntman/actor or Gaijin tarento.  Raised in Buckfield, Maine, he attended Dartmouth College (Class of 1999), majoring in East Asian Languages and Literatures and minoring in Drama.  He took the fall term of his senior year there to go to China to study Northern Shaolin Kung Fu.  After college, he moved to Japan, where, after getting his start doing a women's underwear commercial, he was soon recruited by AAC Stunts.  Since then, he has worked on various tokusatsu series as a stunt/suit actor and even as a regular.  Best known for his role as the mysterious murderer named Piece in the live-action drama Sh15uya, Musashi was also seen in Cutie Honey: The Live as Duke Seiya Anthony Watari IV, a bilingual gentleman in the service of the organization Panther Claw. He has participated in several Wushu competition championships and he has done motion capture for several video games. In 2008, he moved to Los Angeles to pursue American acting and stunt opportunities. Since then, he's largely worked as a stunt performer in films, television shows and video games, with scattered speaking parts.

Video game credits
Uncharted 4: A Thief's End (2017), Sony Computer Entertainment
Titanfall 2 (2016), Respawn Entertainment (Motion Capture)
The Last of Us (2013), Naughty Dog (stunt performer)
Lost Planet 2 (2009), Capcom
Bayonetta (2010), Sega
God Hand (2006), Capcom
Metal Gear Solid 3: Snake Eater (2004), Konami - Yevgeny Borisvitch Volgin (motion actor)
Metal Gear Solid: The Twin Snakes (2004), Konami - Liquid Snake (motion actor)
Resident Evil Outbreak (2004), Capcom
Firefighter F.D.18 (2004), Konami
Arc the Lad: Twilight of the Spirits (2003), Sony Computer Entertainment Incorporated
Dino Crisis 3 (2003), Capcom
7 Days to Die (2013), The Fun Pimps

Movies
Feral (Action Horror 2018)(American)
Welcome Back Satan (Comedy 2010) (American)
Motion actor in Avatar (3-D science fiction film 2009) (American)
Motion actor in Night at the Museum: Battle of the Smithsonian (live-action film 2009) (American)
Stunt coordinator in  Jonas Brothers: The 3D Concert Experience (American)
Wu in Yo-Yo Girl Cop (live-action film 2006) (Japanese)
Kamen Rider 2 (suit actor) in Kamen Rider the First (live-action film 2005) (Japanese)
LAPD in Devilman (live-action film 2004) (Japanese)
MP in Shibuya Monogartari (live-action film 2004) (Japanese)
Panter Claw in Cutie Honey (live-action film 2004) (Japanese)
Stunt work in Godzilla, Mothra, and King Ghidorah: Giant Monsters All-Out Attack (live-action film 2001) (Japanese)

Television
Stunt work in Iron Fist (TV series 2017) (American)
Stunt work in Wizards of Waverly Place season3 #9 (TV series 2010) (American)
Stunt work in Dollhouse season2 #9 (TV series 2009) (American)
Stunt work in Kamen Rider: Dragon Knight (live-action TV 2009) (American)
Mackiyo Taylor in CSI: NY season5 #8 (TV series 2008) (American)
Stunt work in iCarly: iGo to Japan (TV series 2008) (American)
Duke Watari in Cutie Honey: The Live (live-action TV 2007-2008) (Japanese)
Kodama, DAN (suit actor) in Garo Special: Byakuya no Maju (live-action film 2006) (Japanese)
Kodama, ZERO (suit actor) in GARO (live-action TV 2005-2006) (Japanese)
Piece in Sh15uya (live-action TV 2005) (Japanese)
Hansel in The Continental (live-action TV, TBA) (American)

References

External links
Musashi's official site
Musashi's official weblog (AAC Stunts)
Interview with Mark Musashi (HenshinJustice.com)

Mark Musashi clip in 2003 Wushu Competition (Changquan)
Mark Musashi clip in 2003 Wushu Competition (Spear)

1977 births
Living people
Japanese male actors
Dartmouth College alumni
Actors from Iwate Prefecture
People from Buckfield, Maine
Sportspeople from Iwate Prefecture